The 1949 Notre Dame Fighting Irish football team represented the University of Notre Dame during the 1949 college football season.  The Irish, coached by Frank Leahy, ended the season with 10 wins and no losses, winning the national championship. The 1949 team became the seventh Irish team to win the national title and the third in four years. Led by Heisman winner Leon Hart, the Irish outscored their opponents 360–86. The 1949 team is the last team in what is considered to be the Notre Dame Football dynasty, a stretch of games in which Notre Dame went 46–0–2 and won three national championships and two Heisman Trophies. The Irish squad was cited by Sports Illustrated as the part of the second best sports dynasty (professional or collegiate) of the 20th century and second greatest college football dynasty.

Schedule

Personnel

Depth chart

Coaching staff
Head coach: Frank Leahy

Assistants: Bernie Crimmins (first assistant / backfield), John F. Druze (chief scout), Bill Earley (backfield), Joe McArdle (guards), Robert McBride (tackles), Fred Miller (volunteer assistant), Benjamin Sheridan (freshmen)

Postseason

Award winners
Leon Hart - Heisman Trophy, Maxwell Award

Heisman voting:
Leon Hart, 1st
Bob Williams, 5th
Emil Sitko, 8th

All-Americans:

College Football Hall of Fame Inductees:

Notre Dame leads all universities in players inducted.

1950 NFL Draft
The following players were drafted into professional football following the season.

References

Notre Dame
Notre Dame Fighting Irish football seasons
College football national champions
College football undefeated seasons
Notre Dame Fighting Irish football